Mihaela Maria Botezan (born 21 November 1976 in Ocna Mureş) is a Romanian long-distance runner who specializes mainly in the 10000 metres and the half marathon. She represented Romania at the 2004 Summer Olympics, the 2002 European Athletics Championships, twice at the World Championships in Athletics (2001, 2003) and five times at the IAAF World Half Marathon Championships.

She holds the current Romanian national record in the 10,000 m with 31:11.24 minutes, achieved at the 2004 Summer Olympics. This beat Viorica Ghican's time which had stood since 1990.

She received a two-year ban from the sport for doping, after testing positive for chlorthalidone (a diuretic) at the 2007 Hamburg Marathon.

International competitions

Personal bests
3000 metres - 9:02.61 min (2003)
3000 metres steeplechase - 10:08.46 min (1999)
5000 metres - 15:08.78 min (2001)
10,000 metres - 31:11.24 min (2004)
Half marathon - 1:09:24 hrs (2002)
Marathon - 2:25:32 hrs (2003)

See also
List of doping cases in athletics

References

marathoninfo

1976 births
People from Ocna Mureș
Living people
Olympic athletes of Romania
Athletes (track and field) at the 2004 Summer Olympics
Romanian female long-distance runners
Romanian female marathon runners
Romanian female steeplechase runners
World Athletics Championships athletes for Romania
Romanian sportspeople in doping cases
Doping cases in athletics